The Spokane Chiefs are a defunct senior ice hockey team that played in the Western International Hockey League from 1982 to 1985. They were the 1984–85 Champions of the WIHL.

Championships

References

Western International Hockey League teams
Sports in Spokane, Washington
Defunct ice hockey teams in the United States
Ice hockey teams in Washington (state)